Sergei Aleksandrovich Shvetsov (born 7 December 1960 in Kutaisi) is a retired Soviet football player. He is probably most known for the goal he scored in the UEFA Cup game between FC Spartak Moscow and HFC Haarlem, which finished with the Luzhniki disaster.

International career
Shvetsov played his only game for USSR on 4 December 1980 in a friendly against Argentina.

External links 
  Profile

1960 births
Living people
Soviet footballers
Soviet Union international footballers
Soviet expatriate footballers
Russian footballers
Russian expatriate footballers
Expatriate footballers in Belgium
FC Zenit Saint Petersburg players
FC Spartak Moscow players
FC Baltika Kaliningrad players
FC Guria Lanchkhuti players
Soviet Top League players
Association football defenders